Greg Greenway (born in Richmond, Virginia, United States) is an American folk singer-songwriter. He is part of the folk scene in the Boston area. His humorous song "Massachusetts" was included on the "Car Talk" radio program. He has eight solo albums  and three additional albums with the harmony trio Brother Sun. In 2017 Greg Greenway also embarked on a project with fellow singer-songwriter, Reggie Harris, called Deeper Than The Skin  which tours throughout the United States talking about building bridges between the races.

Discography

Solo works
 A Road Worth Walking Down (1992)
 Singing for the Landlord (1995)
 Mussolini's Head (1998)
 Something Worth Doing (2001)
 Greg Greenway: Live (2003)
 Weightless (2006)
 Standing on the Side of Love (2008)
 20,000 Versions of the Sun (2016)

Brother Sun albums
 Brother Sun (2011)
 Some Part of the Truth (2013)
 Weights and Wings (2016)

References

External links 
 Official Greg Greenway Web Site
 Official Brother Sun Web Site
 Deeper Than The Skin Web Site

e

Year of birth missing (living people)
Living people
American male singer-songwriters
Fast Folk artists
American folk musicians
Musicians from Richmond, Virginia
Singer-songwriters from Virginia